The Sign of Diolyx is a Big Finish Productions audio drama based on the British science fiction television series The Tomorrow People.

Synopsis 
Homo Superior - the next stage of human evolution. Young people with super powers, dedicated to safeguarding planet Earth. From their secret laboratory deep beneath the streets of London, aided by their super-computer TIM, they watch and wait for others like themselves - and guard against threats to all mankind. They are the Tomorrow People.

A new TP is breaking out, but something is horribly wrong. John and Paul travel to the Welsh village of Llan-Gwyliadwriaeth, but find that a psi dampening field is hampering their investigation and that young Alison Hardy has no intention of embracing her dormant powers.

Meanwhile TIM discovers an energy signature connecting the village with a mysterious ship in hyperspace. Against Tim's better judgement, Elena goes to investigate and finds herself trapped with a ravenous alien entity.

What is the connection between the local vicar and the coven in Alison's dreams? What links an ancient stone circle and the ship in hyperspace? Who or what is Diolyx?

The Tomorrow People find that they have stumbled upon an ancient evil. An evil that is about to be unleashed upon the world.

Plot 
Part 1: Warning Shadows

Part 2: Into the Dark

Part 3: Electric Dreams

Cast
John - Nicholas Young
Elena - Helen Goldwyn
Paul - Daniel Wilson
TIM - Philip Gilbert
Mr. Hardy - Gareth Thomas
Alison - Clare Buckfield
Rev. Jane Green - Louise Falkner
Diolyx - Toby Longworth

External links
The Sign of Diolyx product page at Big Finish archived by archive.org
The Sign of Diolyx

British radio dramas
2002 audio plays
The Tomorrow People